Joan the Woman is a 1916 American epic silent drama film directed by Cecil B. DeMille and starring Geraldine Farrar as Joan of Arc. The film premiered on Christmas Day in 1916. This was DeMille's first historical drama. The screenplay is based on Friedrich Schiller's 1801 play Die Jungfrau von Orleans (The Maid of Orleans). This film was considered to be the "first cinematic spectacle about Joan of Arc."

This was the first film to use the Handschiegl Color Process (billed as the "Wyckoff-DeMille Process") for certain scenes. This process is especially noticeable in the scene of Joan burning at the stake, the use of red and yellow gave this a heightened dramatic effect. A print of the film still exists. DeMille has said that in the weeks before shooting he became obsessed with historical research, costume and set design, and casting decisions.

Plot
A British officer (Reid) in World War I has a dream of the life of Joan of Arc (Farrar). The officer pulls a sword out of the wall of the trench he is in, the sword used to belong to Joan of Arc. Removing the sword conjures up the ghost of Joan, leading to her telling her story. The setting then changes to France where the story of Joan of Arc is told, of her leading the French troops to victory and her subsequent burning at the stake. The story ends back in the trench with the officer deciding to go on a suicide mission, using Joan's story and sword as inspiration.

Cast

 Geraldine Farrar as Jeanne d'Arc (Joan of Arc)
 Raymond Hatton as Charles VII
 Hobart Bosworth as Gen. La Hire
 Theodore Roberts as Cauchon
 Wallace Reid as Eric Trent 1431 / Eric Trent 1917
 Charles Clary as La Tremouille
 James Neill as Laxart
 Tully Marshall as L'Oiseleur
 Lawrence Peyton as Gaspard
 Horace B. Carpenter as Jacques d'Arc
 Cleo Ridgely as The king's favorite
 Lillian Leighton as Isambeau
 Marjorie Daw as Katherine
 Stephen Gray as Pierre
 Ernest Joy as Robert de Beaudricourt
 John Oaker as Jean de Metz
 Hugo B. Koch as Duke of Burgundy
 William Conklin as John of Luxembourg
 Walter Long as The executioner
 William Elmer as Guy Townes
 Emilius Jorgensen as Michael
 Donald Crisp
 Jack Hoxie
 Lucien Littlefield
 Nigel De Brulier as Man at trial (uncredited)
 Jack Holt (uncredited)
 Fred Kohler as L'Oiseleur's henchman (uncredited)
 Ramón Novarro as Starving Peasant (uncredited)

Production 
The original plan for Joan the Woman was for it to be the first of two shorter, unrelated films starring Farrar and directed by DeMille. However, in the early stages of filming in May 1916, producer Jesse L. Lansky convinced DeMille to combine the two efforts into a single, longer film about Joan of Arc.

Release and reception
The film was released on December 25, 1916 and grossed $605,731 at the box office.

The film has been criticized by some as propaganda for World War I. The film begins and ends with the story of a British officer in the trenches fighting in World War I. He is prompted with the decision to participate in a suicide mission. He discovers a sword that belonged to Joan, and after hearing her story, decides to go on the mission. Robin Blaetz in her book Studies in Medievalism points out the sexism that exists in the film. While Joan was the inspiration for the British soldier's heroic acts, he is ultimately the hero at the end of the film. Blaetz points out that this sends the message that "women and war do not mix", alluding to the idea that in World War I women should stay behind the front lines, but still be supportive of those at war.

In his review of the film, Leonard Maltin said this was "DeMille's first historical epic is nicely mounted, spotlighting the heroism and sacrifice of Joan of Arc (a miscast Farrar) as she evolves from peasant girl to saint-like figure and becomes involved with Englishman Reid. Fashioned as an accolade to France, with the story bookended by sequences set during WW1 involving a soldier who is inspired by Joan's bravery. Some of the effects are in color."

Attempted film piracy

In 1917 three men were arrested for the theft of a print of the film from a New York film exchange, which they took to New Jersey for the making of a new master negative. Both the missing print and the master were recovered. At that time there was an active criminal practice in making master negatives of American films for shipment to other countries for the production of new prints, an early example of motion picture piracy.

See also
 Cultural depictions of Joan of Arc
 List of early color feature films

References

External links

1916 films
1916 drama films
1910s color films
American black-and-white films
American war epic films
American silent feature films
Articles containing video clips
Early color films
Films directed by Cecil B. DeMille
Films about Joan of Arc
Paramount Pictures films
Western Front (World War I) films
1910s English-language films
1910s American films
Silent adventure films
Silent war films